The 18th Toronto International Film Festival (TIFF) took place in Toronto, Ontario, Canada between September 9 and September 18, 1993. M. Butterfly by David Cronenberg was selected as the opening film.

Forest Whitaker won FIPRESCI International Critics' Award for Strapped.

Awards

Programme

Gala presentations
 The Accompanist (L'Accompagnatrice), Claude Miller
 Belle Époque, Fernando Trueba
 Bitter Moon, Roman Polanski
 Bopha!, Morgan Freeman
 A Bronx Tale by Robert De Niro
 A Dangerous Woman, Stephen Gyllenhaal
 Even Cowgirls Get the Blues, Gus Van Sant
 Flight of the Innocent, Carlo Carlei
 The Joy Luck Club, Wayne Wang
 A Life in the Theatre, Gregory Mosher
 Love and Human Remains, Denys Arcand
 M. Butterfly, David Cronenberg
  (Der Kinoerzähler), Bernhard Sinkel
 The Piano, Jane Campion
 Red Rock West, John Dahl
 Rudy, David Anspaugh
 The Snapper, Stephen Frears
 Thirty Two Short Films About Glenn Gould, François Girard

Special presentations
Arizona Dream, Emir Kusturica
The Baby of Mâcon, Peter Greenaway
El Cid, Anthony Mann
L'enfant lion, Patrick Grandperret
Farewell My Concubine, Chen Kaige
Friends, Elaine Proctor
Hadashi no pikunikku, Shinobu Yaguchi
Madadayo, Akira Kurosawa
The Puppetmaster, Hou Hsiao-hsien
Romeo Is Bleeding, Peter Medak
The Saint of Fort Washington by Tim Hunter
Three Colors: Blue, Krzysztof Kieślowski

World Cinema
1, 2, 3, Sun (Un, deux, trois, soleil), Bertrand Blier
The Ballad of Little Jo, Maggie Greenwald
The Cement Garden, Andrew Birkin
La Crise, Coline Serreau
Daens, Stijn Coninx
Darkness in Tallinn, Ilkka Järvi-Laturi
Gorilla Bathes at Noon, Dusan Makavejev
Half Japanese: The Band That Would Be King, Jeff Feuerzeig
Hélas pour moi, Jean-Luc Godard
Household Saints, Nancy Savoca
Le journal de Lady M., Alain Tanner
, 
Lessons of Darkness, Werner Herzog
Naked by Mike Leigh
A New Life (Une nouvelle vie), Olivier Assayas
Raining Stones, Ken Loach
Samba Traoré, Idrissa Ouedraogo
Sankofa, Haile Gerima
Shadow of a Doubt (L'ombre du doute), Aline Issermann
These Hands, Flora M’mbugu-Schelling
The Wedding Banquet, Ang Lee
Wendemi, l'enfant du bon Dieu, S. Pierre Yameogo
The Wonderful Horrible Life of Leni Riefenstahl, Ray Müller

Italian Section
L'aria serena dell'ovest by Silvio Soldini
Un'anima divisa in due by Silvio Soldini

Latin American Panorama
Cronos, Guillermo del Toro
I Don't Want to Talk About It, Marcello Mastroianni
Unexpected Encounter (Encuentro Inesperado), Jaime Humberto Hermosillo

The Edge
Kosh ba kosh by Bakhtyar Khudojnazarov

Spotlight
Roi blanc, dame rouge by Sergei Bodrov

Canadian Perspective
Because Why, Arto Paragamian
Blockade, Nettie Wild
The Burning Season, Harvey Crossland
Cap Tourmente, Michel Langlois
Crad Kilodney, Peter F. Glen
I Love a Man in Uniform, David Wellington
Kanehsatake: 270 Years of Resistance, Alanis Obomsawin
Ley Lines, Patricia Gruben
The Lotus Eaters, Paul Shapiro
Me, Mom and Mona, Mina Shum
Moving the Mountain, William Ging Wee Dere and Malcolm Guy
Mustard Bath, Darrell Wasyk
Paris, France, Jerry Ciccoritti
Picture of Light, Peter Mettler
Save My Lost Nigga Soul, Clement Virgo
The Sex of the Stars (Le sexe des étoiles), Paule Baillargeon
Small Pleasures, Keith Lock
Telewhore, Spencer Rice
Two Brothers, a Girl and a Gun, William Hornecker
Zero Patience, John Greyson

10 x 10
The Dead Father, Guy Maddin
The Forgotten War (La Guerre oubliée), Richard Boutet
The Grocer's Wife, John Pozer
Intimate Power (Pouvoir intime), Yves Simoneau
Life Classes, William D. MacGillivray
Pissoir, John Greyson
Sonatine, Micheline Lanctôt

First Cinema
Boxing Helena, Jennifer Lynch
Don't Call Me Frankie, Thomas Fucci
Kalifornia, Dominic Sena
Menace II Society, Allen and Albert Hughes
The Scent of Green Papaya, Tran Anh Hung 
Suture, Scott McGehee and David Siegel

Midnight Madness
Acción mutante by Álex de la Iglesia
Dazed and Confused by Richard Linklater
Freaked by Alex Winter & Tom Stern
Frauds by Stephan Elliott
Jack Be Nimble by Garth Maxwell
The Last Border by Mika Kaurismäki
The Making of And God Spoke by Arthur Borman
Trauma by Dario Argento
Wicked City by Yoshiaki Kawajiri
The Wicked City by Tsui Hark, Peter Mak

Top 10 Canadian Films of All Time
In 1993 a new Top 10 Canadian Films of All Time list was made, an exercise previously carried out in 1984 and later repeated in 2004.

References

External links
 Official site
 TIFF: A Reel History: 1976 - 2012
1993 Toronto International Film Festival at IMDb

1993
1993 film festivals
1993 in Toronto
1993 in Canadian cinema